Guomao may refer to:

 Guomao, Beijing, area in Chaoyang District, the central business district of Beijing, China
 Guomao Station (Beijing), subway train station at Line 1 and Line 10 of Beijing Subway
 Guomao Station (Shenzhen), subway train station at Line 1 of Shenzhen Metro